The 2012–13 season was Olympiacos's 54th consecutive season in the Super League Greece and their 87th year in existence. They competed in the Greek Super League, Greek Cup, UEFA Champions League and UEFA Europa League.

Olympiacos completed a domestic double, winning the Super League and the Greek Cup. Olympiacos won the title for a third consecutive season, reaching 40 domestic titles and therefore adding a fourth star to the team's shirt.

The club finished third in Group B of the Champions League, which resulted in them entering the Europa League. Olympiacos was eliminated in Round of 32 by Levante with two defeats, falling 0–4 on aggregate.

Squad
Updated 7 April 2013

Transfers

Summer

In:

Out:

Winter

In:

Out:

Competitions

Super League Greece

League table

Results summary

Results by round

Matches

Greek Cup

Third round

Fourth round

Quarter-finals

Semi-finals

Final

UEFA Champions League

Group stage

Group B

UEFA Europa League

Knockout phase

Round of 32

Squad statistics

Appearances and goals

|-
|colspan="14"|Players who left Olympiacos on loan during the season:

|-
|colspan="14"|Players who appeared for Olympiacos but left during the season:

|}

Goal scorers

Disciplinary record

Team kit

References

External links 
 Official Website of Olympiacos Piraeus 

Olympiacos F.C. seasons
Olympiacos
Olympiacos
Olympiacos
Greek football championship-winning seasons